This is a list of airports in Indonesia, sorted by location.

The Republic of Indonesia
comprises 17,000 islands in Southeast Asia and Oceania. Indonesia shares land borders with Papua New Guinea, East Timor, and Malaysia. Other neighboring countries include Singapore, Philippines, Australia, and the Indian territory of the Andaman and Nicobar Islands. Indonesia's capital city is Jakarta.

Indonesia has 673 airports in 2013, ranging from grand international airports to modest unpaved airstrips on remote islands or inland interior areas located throughout the archipelago. Most of them operated by Transportation Ministry technical operation units and state-owned PT Angkasa Pura I & II. Based on the 2009 Aviation Law, the government had to transfer air navigation service management from airport operators to a non-profit institution by January 2012 to improve Air traffic services (ATS).



Airports

See also 
 Aviation in Indonesia
 Transport in Indonesia
 List of airports by ICAO code: W#WA WI WQ WR - Indonesia
 Wikipedia:WikiProject Aviation/Airline destination lists: Asia#Indonesia

References

External links 
 PT. Angkasa Pura 1 (PERSERO)
 PT. Angkasa Pura II
 Indonesia Airport Info 
 
 
  – includes IATA codes
  – IATA codes and airport data
  – IATA and ICAO codes

Infrastructure in Indonesia
Indonesia
 
Airports
Airports
Indonesia